The 2018 Liga Dominicana de Fútbol season (known as the LDF Banco Popular for sponsorship reasons) is the fourth season of professional football in the Dominican Republic. Atlántico FC are the reigning champions, having won this first title last season. The season started on 7 April 2018 and ended on 27 October 2018.

Team changes
While there is no promotion or relegation involving this league, there were changes to the composition of the league from last season. Bauger FC have left the league following last season. Meanwhile, three new teams have joined the league: Jarabacoa FC, Inter RD, and Atlético de San Francisco. Thus, the league now has 12 teams in total.

Format changes
The format of the competition has changed for this season. The regular season will still consist of a double round robin between the participating teams. After this, a Liguilla round will be played between the top six finishers of the regular season, with a single round robin between the teams. The top 4 finishers of this phase will move on to the knockout phase of the playoffs, where the champion will be decided. The top team at the end of the regular season along with the playoff champion will qualify for the 2019 Caribbean Club Championship.

Stadia and locations

Regular season
The regular season began on 7 April 2018 and ended on 26 August 2018. The regular season winner qualified for the 2019 Caribbean Club Championship.

Regular season table

Regular season results

Liguilla
The top 6 teams from the regular season participated in a single round robin tournament to determine who qualifies for the championship playoffs. The liguilla started on 1 September 2018 and ended on 30 September 2018.

Ligilla table

Liguilla results

Championship playoffs
The top 4 finishers of the Liguilla qualify for this phase. These matches began on 6 October 2018 and ended on 27 October 2018.

Semifinals
The first legs were played on 6 and 7 October 2018 and the second legs were played on 20 and 21 October 2018.

Finals
Tha final was played on 27 October 2018.

References

Football in the Dominican Republic
Dominican Republic
Dominican Republic
2018 in Dominican Republic sport
Liga Dominicana de Fútbol seasons